The Islamic Republic of Pakistan maintains a large network of diplomatic relations across the world. Pakistan is the second largest Muslim-majority country in terms of population (after Indonesia) and is the only Muslim majority nation to have possession of nuclear weapons.

Pakistan's economy is integrated into the world with strong trade ties to the EU and economic alliances and agreements with many Asian nations.

Pakistan is in a strategic geopolitical location, being situated at the corridor of major maritime and land-based transit routes reaching from the energy-rich regions of Central Asia and the Middle East, to the population centers of South and East Asia. Pakistan also has geostrategic hotspots such as Afghanistan, China, India and Iran as immediate neighbors. Pakistan maintains a tense relationship with India due to the Kashmir conflict, close ties with the People's Republic of China, Turkey, Saudi Arabia and Gulf Arab states, and fluctuating relationship with the United States of America due to overlapping interests during the Cold War and War on Terror. Pakistan is a member of the United Nations , Shanghai Cooperation Organisation (SCO) , Organisation of Islamic Cooperation (OIC) and more .

International recognition of Pakistan
After Pakistan gained its independence in August 1947, Iran was the first country to recognize its sovereign status. The United States was the first non-Muslim country to recognize Pakistan and France was the first country where Pakistan's flag was raised.

Recognition of Pakistan in 1947:

Foreign policy of Pakistan 

Pakistan's Foreign Policy seeks to protect, promote and advance Pakistan's national interests in the comity of nations”

M A Jinnah's Vision
On 15 August 1947,  outlining the foreign policy of Pakistan, Quaid-e-Azam observed:
"Our objective should be peace within and peace without. We want to live peacefully and maintain cordial and friendly relations with our immediate neighbours and with world at large. We have no aggressive designs against any one. We stand by the United Nations Charter and will gladly make our contribution to the peace and prosperity of the world."

The foreign policy of Pakistan sets out in the way it interacts with foreign nations and to determine its standard of interactions for its organizations, corporations and individual citizens. The Foreign Minister of Pakistan is the official charged with state-to-state diplomacy, although the Prime minister maintains an ultimate authority over foreign policy. The state foreign policy includes defining the national interest, as well as the economic interest and strategies chosen both to safeguard that and to achieve its policy goals. Following the general election held on May 2013, Tariq Fatimi and NSA Sartaj Aziz were designated as advisers to the Prime Minister on foreign and strategic policies. After the dismissal of Nawaz Sharif's government in July 2017, Khawaja Muhammad Asif held the portfolio of foreign minister under the premiership of Shahid Khaqan Abbasi. After the victory of Imran Khan Niazi in the Pakistan General Elections 2018, Shah Mehmood Qureshi was named the Minister of Foreign Affairs. After the fall of the Pakistan Tehreek-e-Insaf-led coalition government in 2022, there was much speculation as to who would be the next foreign minister. It ultimately became clear that Bilawal Bhutto Zardari, chairman of the Pakistan People's Party (the second largest member of the newly formed coalition government), would serve as foreign minister—a position previously held by his grandfather, Zulfikar Ali Bhutto, and an alleged affair partner of his, Hina Rabbani Khar.

Historical overview

In 1947, Muhammad Ali Jinnah, founder of the state of Pakistan, clearly described the principles and objectives of Pakistan's foreign policy in a broadcast message, which is featured prominently in a quotation on the homepage of Pakistan's Ministry of Foreign Affairs website: "The foundation of our foreign policy is friendship with all nations across the globe."

Since its independence in 1947, Pakistan's foreign policy has encompassed difficult relations with the neighbouring Soviet Union (USSR) who maintained a close military and ideological interaction with the neighbouring countries such as Afghanistan (in the West) and India (in East).  During most of 1947–1991, the USSR support was given to Republic of India, over which it has fought three wars on Kashmir conflict. During the 1960s, Pakistan's relations with and neighbouring Afghanistan have also been extremely difficult due to the latter's contest over the Durand Line. The foreign relations with Iran, Turkey, Saudi Arabia and China remain extremely important and based on the extensive cooperation in national security and economical interests in the Persian Gulf and wide-ranging bilateral relations with the United States and other Western countries. With the growing influence of USSR in the region, Pakistan cemented close security relations with China in Asia and Poland, United Kingdom and Germany in Europe during most of the Cold War. While Pakistan had "on-off relations" with the United States, Pakistan assisted President Nixon reapproach with China and other East Asian countries. Imran Khan visited Moscow to meet President Vladimir Putin as Russia was launching the invasion of Ukraine. He has previously criticised America's “War on Terror“.

Pakistan's ties with Russia have moved past the bitter Cold War hostilities in recent years and the chill in the relations between Pakistan and the U.S. has further pushed the country towards Russia and China.

Pakistan-China relations

China has played a significant role in the development, economy and security of Pakistan, with relationship beginning in 1950 when Pakistan was among the first countries to enter into official diplomatic relations with the Republic of China (on Taiwan Island) and recognizes the People's Republic of China (PRC) on Mainland China as the sole representative. Since then, both countries have placed considerable importance on the maintenance of an extremely close and supportive special relationship and the two countries have regularly exchanged high-level visits resulting in a variety of agreements. The PRC has provided economic, military, and technical assistance to Pakistan, and each country considers the other a close strategic ally. Since the advent of the 21st century, Pakistan and China have strengthened their relations through bilateral trade, military agreements and supporting each other on key issues. The intensifying US-China Strategic Rivalry has put Pakistan in an extremely difficult situation to maintain ties with both of these states. Bilawal Bhutto Zardari accused UN Human Rights Office report on Xinjiang were “taken out of context”, and Pakistan supports China's activities for socio-economic development, harmony and peace, and stability.

Pakistan–United States relations

The United States has played an important role in the young history of Pakistan, being one of the first countries to recognize their independence on 14 August 1947.  The relationship between the two countries went through varying levels of friendliness, but Pakistan consistently found themselves on the United States side of issues faced during the Cold War. Pakistan served as a geostrategic position for United States military bases during the Cold War since it bordered the Soviet Union and China. These positive relations would fall apart following successful cooperation in fighting the Soviet Union's influence in Central Asia and the subsequent fall of the Soviet Union.

In reaction to Pakistan's new nuclear capacity, the United States in 1992 passed the Pressler Amendment approving sanctions against Pakistan, Relations would restrengthen following 9/11 with Pakistan's warm response following the tragedy.  Aid was given to Pakistan for the first time again in 2002, and the 2000s saw an extension of this friendly relationship.

As the War on Terror continued to linger, the United States and Pakistan would disagree on strategies while also accusing each other of various things.  This dynamic would reach a head following a few incidents highlighted by the operation to kill Osama bin Laden in Abbottabad.  While these incidents wore down the trust between the two nations, the two would continue to share a healthy relationship.  Although the two countries do not view each other favorably in polls, the two governments share an important relationship featuring multiple types of aid to Pakistan, important military cooperation and collaboration, and a strategic ally in Central Asia for the United States The United States and Pakistan's relationship persists of promoting trade and regional economic cooperation, this type of relationship is beneficial for both countries and gives incentive for continuing friendly relations. U.S. also has concerns regarding Pakistan include regional and global terrorism; Afghan stability; democratization and human rights protection; the ongoing Kashmir problem and Pakistan-India tensions; and economic development. Recently US stopped military aid to Pakistan, which was about US$2 billion per year. America's deference to India reflects its importance to counter China's influence in Asia. This imposes a ceiling on cooperation with Pakistan, limiting it to the non-strategic domain.

Muslim world 

After Independence, Pakistan vigorously pursued bilateral relations with other Muslim countries and made a wholehearted bid for leadership of the Muslim world, or at least for leadership in achieving its unity. The Ali brothers had sought to project Pakistan as the natural leader of the Islamic world, in large part due to its large manpower and military strength. A top-ranking Muslim League leader, Khaliquzzaman, declared that Pakistan would bring together all Muslim countries into Islamistan – a pan-Islamic entity. Such developments (alongside Pakistan's creation) did not get American approval and British Prime Minister Clement Attlee voiced international opinion at the time by stating that he wished that India and Pakistan would re-unite. Since most of the Arab world was undergoing a nationalist awakening at the time, there was little attraction to Pakistan's Pan-Islamic aspirations. Some of the Arab countries saw the 'Islamistan' project as a Pakistani attempt to dominate other Muslim states.

Pakistan vigorously championed the right of self-determination for Muslims around the world. Pakistan's efforts for the independence movements of Indonesia, Libya, Algeria, Tunisia, Egypt, Morocco, Somalia, Azerbaijan, and Eritrea were significant and initially led to close ties between these countries and Pakistan. However, Pakistan also masterminded an attack on the Afghan city of Jalalabad during the Afghan Civil War to establish an Islamic government there. Pakistan had wished to foment an 'Islamic Revolution' which would transcend national borders covering Pakistan, Afghanistan and Central Asia.

On the other hand, Pakistan's relations with Iran have been strained at times due to sectarian tensions. Iran and Saudi Arabia used Pakistan as a battleground for their proxy sectarian war and by the 1990s, Pakistan's support for the Sunni Taliban organization in Afghanistan became a problem for Shia Iran which opposed a Taliban-controlled Afghanistan. Tensions between Iran and Pakistan intensified in 1998, when Iran accused Pakistan of war crimes as Pakistani warplanes bombarded Afghanistan's last Shia stronghold in support of the Taliban.

Major alliances

In 1947 after gaining independence from the United Kingdom, Pakistan still had close ties with the country. The Prime Minister Liaquat Ali Khan also paid a historical and friendly state visit to the United States, and held meetings with President Harry Truman and the American military officials for the purpose of the military aid in 1951. Ideologically, Prime Minister Ali Khan was opposed to communism; and his government was struggling with issues concerning the matters of uplifting the national economy and protecting interests of national security. In 1954–56, the United States and Pakistan signed the Mutual Defense Assistance Agreement which saw the dispatching of the Military Assistance Advisory Group to provide military training to the Pakistan Armed Forces in 1955–56.

In 1955, Pakistan joined the CENTO and the SEATO alliances. Also, in 1956, when Pakistan declared itself a republic, it continued as a member of the Commonwealth of Nations.  In 1971, Pakistan withdrew itself from the two alliances in a vision of exercising an independent foreign policy.  In 1964, Pakistan signed the Regional Cooperation for Development (RCD) Pact with Turkey and Iran, when all three countries were closely allied with the U.S., and as neighbours of the Soviet Union, wary of perceived Soviet expansionism. To this day, Pakistan has a close relationship with Turkey. RCD became defunct after the Iranian Revolution, and a Pakistani-Turkish initiative led to the founding of the Economic Cooperation Organization (ECO) in 1985. In 1974, Pakistan became a critical entity in the militarization of the OIC and has historically maintained friendly relations with all the Arab and Muslim countries under the banner of OIC. Pakistan rejoined the Commonwealth in 1989. In 2004, Pakistan became a Major non-NATO ally of the United States.

Pakistan was a member of the Commonwealth from 1947 to 1956 under the name 'Dominion of Pakistan'. From 1956 to 1972, the Islamic Republic of Pakistan was a republic in the Commonwealth of Nations, when it withdrew in protest at the Commonwealth's support of East Pakistan's secession and Bangladesh's independence. In 1989, Pakistan rejoined, despite Pakistan's suspension from the Commonwealth of Nations between 1999 and 2008.

At the Astana Summit on 9 June 2017, Pakistan became full members of the Shanghai Cooperation Organisation (SCO).

Major dissensions

Since 1947, Pakistan's relations have been difficult with neighbour India over regional issues. India and Pakistan have fought three conventional wars throughout the 20th century over the issue of Kashmir. There have been attempts to unite the countries but since 1940, Muhammad Ali Jinnah and his Muslim League had demanded an independent Pakistan, whose Muslims would have their own government rather than remaining subordinate to India's Hindu majority. There are many sources of tension between the two countries but the issues over terrorism, size disparities and three geostrategic issues: Kashmir, water, and the Siachen Glacier, are the major ones resulting in the attenuated volume of trade and trust deficit. The continuing dispute over the status of Kashmir inflames opinions in both nations and makes friendly relations difficult. In the 1960s, the problems over the Durand Line escalated with Afghanistan which led to open hostilities in the 1970s. Pakistan is also a member of the Coffee Club to oppose Indian membership in the United Nations Security Council. Former Prime Minister Imran Khan had named senior U.S. diplomat Donald Lu as the person who was allegedly involved in the “foreign conspiracy“ to topple his government through a no-confidence vote tabled by the Opposition. The U.S. has repeatedly dismissed Khan's allegations.

Relations by country

Africa

Americas

Asia

Europe

Oceania

International organizations

See also

 History of Pakistan
 Ministry of Foreign Affairs
 List of diplomatic missions in Pakistan
 List of diplomatic missions of Pakistan
 Visa requirements for Pakistani citizens
 Pakistan and the United Nations
 Public diplomacy of Pakistan

References

Further reading
 Choudhury, G.W. India, Pakistan, Bangladesh, and the Major Powers: Politics of a Divided Subcontinent (1975), relations with US, USSR and China.
 Fair, C. Christine. Fighting to the End: The Pakistan Army's Way of War. (Oxford UP, 2014).
 Hussain, Nazir. "Pak-Russia Relations: Lost Opportunities and Future Options." Journal of Political Studies (2012). 19#1 pp 79–89  online
 Jabeen, Mussarat, and Muhammad Saleem Mazhar. "Security Game: SEATO and CENTO SEATO and CENTO As Instrument of Economic and Military Assistance to Encircle Pakistan" Pakistan Economic and Social Review 49#1 (2011), pp. 109–132 online
 Khan, Muhammad Taimur Fahad. "Pakistan's Foreign Policy towards Russia." Strategic Studies 39.3 (2019): 89-104. online
 Pande, Aparna. Explaining Pakistan's foreign policy: escaping India (Routledge, 2011).
 Sattar, Abdul. Pakistan's Foreign Policy, 1947-2012: A Concise History  (3rd ed. Oxford UP,  2013). online 2nd 2009 edition
 Siddiqi, Shibil. "Afghanistan-Pakistan relations: History and geopolitics in a regional and international context." Final Report (Walter and Duncan Gordon Foundation) 45 (2008).  online
 Singh, Besakh. "Pakistan and Russia Relationship: Changing Dynamics in the Post-Cold War Era." (MA thesis, Central University of Punjab.  2016); bibliography pp 89=98. online

External links
 Ministry of Foreign Affairs of Pakistan

 
Pakistan and the Commonwealth of Nations
Politics of Pakistan